was a village in Kita District, Ehime Prefecture, Japan. In 1955 it was formally merged into the town of Uchiko.

It had a population of 2,301 in 1921. 

Ōse is the birthplace of Nobel laureate Kenzaburō Ōe.

Dissolved municipalities of Ehime Prefecture